11 Westferry Circus is an office building located on the upper level of Westferry Circus, Canary Wharf development in London, United Kingdom. Reader's Digest owned and occupied the building until 1999, when the company sold the building and leased space in it from the new owner. The building was designed by a consortium of architectural firms.

References

External links
Clyde Offices

Office buildings in London
Buildings and structures in the London Borough of Tower Hamlets
Canary Wharf buildings
Office buildings completed in 1997